Dominika Cibulková was the defending champion, but lost in the first round to Ana Ivanovic.
Samantha Stosur won the title, defeating Victoria Azarenka in the final, 6–2, 6–3.

Seeds
The top four seeds receive a bye into the second round.

Draw

Finals

Top half

Bottom half

Qualifying

Seeds

Qualifiers

Qualifying draw

First qualifier

Second qualifier

Third qualifier

Fourth qualifier

External links
 Main draw
 Qualifying draw

2013 WTA Tour
2013 Singles